The Pankhiya are a community found in the state of Uttar Pradesh in India.

Origin
The Pankhiya are found mainly in the districts of Kanpur, Farrukhabad and Shahjahanpur. They speak Urdu and Hindi.

See also
 Kewat
 Panchpiria

References

Social groups of Uttar Pradesh
Muslim communities of Uttar Pradesh
Muslim communities of India
Fishing communities in India